Joshua Larkin, (born 5 December 1989 in Melbourne) is a professional squash player who represents Australia. He reached a career-high world ranking of World No. 84 in January 2017. Larkin's breakthrough took place in May 2015 when he won back to back titles in both the 2015 South Australian Open and City of Perth Open respectively. He also won the 2017 North Shore Open. Larkin is currently Australia's second youngest player in the top 100.

References

External links 

Australian male squash players
Living people
1989 births
20th-century Australian people
21st-century Australian people